The 2015 Pan American Games, officially the XVII Pan American Games and commonly known as the Toronto 2015 Pan-Am Games, were a major international multi-sport event celebrated in the tradition of the Pan American Games, as governed by Pan American Sports Organization (PASO). The games were held from July 10 to 26, 2015 in Toronto, Ontario, Canada; preliminary rounds in certain events began on July 7, 2015. These were the third Pan American games hosted by Canada, and the first in the province of Ontario. The Games were held at venues in Toronto and seventeen other Golden Horseshoe communities. The Pan American Games and 2015 Parapan American Games were organized by the Toronto Organizing Committee for the 2015 Pan and Parapan American Games (TO2015).

The Games hosted 6,123 athletes and 3,396 team officials representing 41 National Olympic Committees (NOCs) in the Americas, marking the largest multi-sport event hosted in Canada, in terms of athletes competing. A record of 46 percent of competitors were women, the most ever for any multi-sport event. 364 events were contested in 36 sports, which included the 28 sports contested at the 2016 Summer Olympics; certain sports also served as qualification paths for these Olympics. Canoe slalom and golf made their Pan American Games debut, as well as women's competitions in baseball, canoeing and rugby sevens.

In 2019, the organizing committee reported that the games came in under budget by $38 million and left a strong legacy for the region with a legacy fund of over $60 million to maintain these structures for a twenty-year period after the Games were held (i.e., until 2035).

Toronto 2015 was largely seen as a precursor for a Toronto bid for the 2024 Summer Olympics, which never materialized (Paris will host the 2024 Summer Olympics instead). This would have been Toronto's sixth attempt at an Olympic bid.

Bidding process

The Canadian Olympic Committee chose Toronto and the surrounding region as the Canadian candidate. No other Canadian city was given a chance to bid in a domestic race, and thus Toronto was selected without a vote. Toronto's interest in bidding came after failing to land the 1996 Summer Olympics and the 2008 Summer Olympics, which were held in Atlanta and Beijing, respectively.

On February 23, 2009, Toronto City Council and Hamilton City Council approved the bid and confirmed their intentions to support the successful hosting of the event. The official bid book document was submitted to the Pan American Sports Organization (PASO) on May 27, 2009.

PASO made an evaluation visit to Toronto between August 30 and 31, 2009. The team analysed the candidate city features and provided its feedback back to voting members of PASO. The evaluation committee was headed by Julio Maglione, a member of the IOC representing Uruguay and the head of Fédération Internationale de Natation (FINA), the international swimming federation, later renamed World Aquatics. After the visit Maglione said, "Toronto has all the conditions to play host to the Pan American Games."

Host city election
Toronto won the bidding process to host the Pan and Parapan American Games by a vote of the Pan American Sports Organization on November 6, 2009, at the PASO Session held in Guadalajara, Mexico. The result was announced by PASO President Mario Vázquez Raña. Toronto faced two other finalists shortlisted Lima, Peru (which later won the rights to host the 2019 Pan American Games), and Bogotá, Colombia. Toronto earned 33 votes, while contesting candidate cities Lima and Bogotá received 11 and 7 votes, respectively. Then-Mayor of Toronto Rob Ford and Canadian Minister of Sport Bal Gosal received the Pan American Sports Organization flag during the closing ceremony of the 2011 Pan American Games in Guadalajara.

Development and preparation

Venues

The 2015 Pan American Games used a mixture of new venues and existing and temporary facilities, some of them in well-known locations such as Exhibition Place. After the Games, some of the new facilities will be reused in their games time form, while others will be resized. A total of 30 competition venues across 14 municipalities were used for competition. Ten of these venues were newly built, while fifteen were renovated to stage the games.

Toronto was one of the most populous cities in history to hold the Pan American Games.

In January 2012, the Toronto Organizing Committee for the 2015 Pan and Parapan American Games (TO2015) announced that sixty percent of the venues that had been proposed would be dropped in favour of a clustering system seen at other multi-sport events such as the 2012 Summer Olympics in London.

The opening and closing ceremonies were held at Rogers Centre (renamed "Pan Am Dome" due to sponsorship rules). Some of the competition venues in the Toronto area included BMO Field (renamed "Exhibition Stadium" due to sponsorship rules), the Pan Am/Parapan Am Fields, the Enercare Centre and the Toronto Pan Am Sports Centre, while the road cycling and marathon events include High Park west of Exhibition Place. Competition venues outside the city of Toronto included Tim Hortons Field in Hamilton, Hershey Centre, Markham Pan Am Centre in Markham, the GM Centre in Oshawa, and the Royal Canadian Henley Rowing Course in St. Catharines.

Financing
The Toronto 2015 Organizing Committee and three jurisdictions of government were to spend about  million in upgrading and building new venues in the region. An additional  million was to be spent in operating expenses such as venue management and marketing. The Canadian federal government was expected to provide  million in funding for the games, while the City of Toronto's contribution was to be  million. Other municipalities which are hosting sporting events were to cover  million of the costs. All remaining costs were covered by the Government of Ontario. Revenue from the games were expected to cover ten percent of the cost to stage the games. The organizing committee expected to generate  million in revenue. In addition,  million was to be spent on building an athletes' village in the West Don Lands area of Toronto. A further  million was budgeted on security, while transportation costs were around  million. In 2014, the Ontario government provided an additional  million to expand the torch relay, provide additional live broadcasting of events and other features. Therefore, the total spent was expected to be  billion, the highest-ever cost of a single Pan Am Games.

In 2016, Ontario auditor-general Bonnie Lysyk issued a report suggesting that the games were over-budget by  million. However, in 2019, the organizing committee found that the games were actually $38 million under budget, and left a legacy of $60 million to continue to maintain the buildings and facilities built for the games.

Infrastructure

The Union Pearson Express, an airport rail link from Toronto Pearson International Airport to Union Station, started full-time service on June 6, 2015. The games created a deadline for a project that had been stalled for years. In addition, a new GO Transit train station in Hamilton at James Street North opened in time for the games.

In October 2013, an expansion of the Pan Am site was announced to help complete  in gaps in Ontario's Trans Canada Trail and connect communities from Ottawa to Windsor and Fort Erie to Huntsville in time for the games. Connections to the Waterfront Trail were expected to be expanded and complete gaps in the trail.

Athletes' Village

The Athlete's village cost $735 million CAD and had the capacity to hold up to 7,200 athletes and officials. After the games, the village was converted to 746 market-priced condos, 41 market-priced town homes, 250 affordable-rent apartments, 257 student dormitory units for George Brown College, office and retail units, and a YMCA recreation centre. The Athlete's Village was located in the West Don Lands along Front Street between Bayview Avenue and Cherry Street in Toronto. The development was certified LEED Gold.  Five satellite villages (all hotels and university residences) were also used to house athletes that were competing in venues far from the main village.

Satellite villages

Volunteers
The organization committee expected 23,000 volunteers to be required for Pan Am and Parapan Am Games. Over 63,000 applicants applied to become a volunteer. A total of 16,146 volunteers participated as part of the Games.

Ticketing

Ticket sales began on September 15, 2014 for high-demand events such as the ceremonies, via a lottery. Purchasers would find out if they received tickets in November 2014. General sales of tickets began on December 8, 2014. The Games had 1.4 million tickets for sale, with over 75 percent of them priced under .  Despite the comparatively low ticket price, Toronto 2015's ticket sales were noticeably slow with many outlets remarking on the lagging support by local residents. A special report from the Office of the Auditor General of Ontario concluded that "TO2015 eventually sold over 1.1 million of the 1.4 million available tickets—over 1 million for the Pan Am Games (85% of the total available) and 89,000 for the Parapan American Games (49% of the total available)."

Countdown
The one-year countdown took place in Nathan Phillips Square in Downtown Toronto on July 10, 2014, in which a countdown clock was unveiled. A Cirque du Soleil performance was also held there.

Medals
In October 2013, it was announced that the medals for the games would be produced and designed by the Royal Canadian Mint. In September 2014, it was announced that the supplier of the raw minerals used in the medals (over 4,000 in total) would be Toronto-based Barrick Gold. All the materials used in the medals will come from the company's operations in the Pan American region. The copper was mined at the company's Zaldivar mine in Chile, the silver at the Pueblo Viejo mine in the Dominican Republic and the gold was mined at the Hemlo mine in northwestern Ontario in the Unorganized Thunder Bay District near Thunder Bay.

The designs of the medals were revealed on March 3, 2015 at a ceremony at the Royal Ontario Museum. The design of the medals for the first time in an international able-bodied multi-sport event included braille. The artist of the medals is Christi Belcourt. There are three shapes on the front of the medal representing North America, Central America and the Caribbean, and South America, the three regions that competed at the games, while also giving a feel and texture of the medal podium. The back of the medal represents the logo and motto of the games and the design also includes elements and techniques of mokume-gane.

Torch relay

An application period for Canadians to carry the torch opened in October 2014 and continued until December. Anyone aged 13 years or older as of May 30, 2015 was eligible to become a torchbearer. Most of the torchbearers were selected by a random selection, while the others were selected by torch relay communities and games partners.

The torch took a 41-day journey after being lit in May 2015 at the pyramids of Teotihuacan, Mexico north of Mexico City. The torch was brought through a total of 130 communities, mostly in Ontario (with five outside the province: Richmond, Winnipeg, Calgary, Halifax and Montreal). The relay began on May 30, 2015 in Toronto and finished on July 10, the date of the opening ceremony.

The detailed torch relay route and celebration sites were announced on February 24, 2015. The torch arrived in Toronto and then headed to Thunder Bay before visiting all other communities on the route. The relay also visited five National Historic Sites of Canada, six Canadian Forces bases and one provincial park. There were 180 celebrations across the torch relay route.

The Games

Opening ceremony

The opening ceremony of the 2015 Pan American Games took place on Friday July 10, 2015, beginning at 8:00 p.m. EDT at the Pan Am Dome. The opening ceremony was produced and directed by Cirque du Soleil. The production became the largest event produced by the company.

Governor General David Johnston officially opened the games. Meanwhile, basketball player Steve Nash was the person who lit the cauldron. Nash ran outside the stadium at the end of the ceremony, where he ignited a bowl, which transferred the fire to the official cauldron. The ceremony concluded with a fireworks display shot off the CN Tower, and all the performers back on stage to celebrate.

Closing ceremony

The closing ceremony took place on Sunday July 26, 2015, beginning at 8:00 p.m. EDT at the Pan Am Dome in Toronto. The closing ceremony was produced and directed jointly by B5C Productions, BaAM Productions and FiveCurrents, in association with Live Nation.
American rapper and music producer Kanye West was chosen as the headliner for the closing ceremony, other performers included Pitbull and Serena Ryder, the former of whom is also American, though the latter is Canadian.

Participating nations
All 41 nations of PASO competed, one fewer than in the 2011 Pan American Games, as the Netherlands Antilles Olympic Committee was dissolved in 2011.

Number of athletes by National Olympic Committee

Sports

A total of 36 sports, 51 disciplines and 364 medal events were contested in these Games. Basque pelota was the only sport dropped from the last games. Golf (after being added to the Olympic program for 2016) also made its Pan American Games debut. Canoe slalom, the only Olympic discipline never to have been held at the Games, also made its debut, meaning for the first time the entire Olympic sports program was contested. Furthermore, both canoe disciplines had C-1 events for women for the first time. Women's baseball and women's rugby sevens also made their debuts, with men's softball returning to the program, after last being contested in 2003. A total of 19 sports (the most ever) were direct or indirect (such as opportunities to gain qualification times) qualifiers for the 2016 Summer Olympics in Rio de Janeiro.

Numbers in parentheses indicate the number of medal events to be contested in each sport/discipline.

Calendar

In the following calendar of events, each blue box represents an event competition, such as a qualification round, on that day. The yellow boxes represent days during which medal-awarding finals for a sport were held. The number in each box represents the number of finals that were contested on that day. Events began three days before the opening ceremony on July 7 and ended with the closing ceremony on July 26.

Medal table

The United States won the most medals with a total of 265. Canada, the host country, won 219 medals. Other notable mentions include Saint Lucia winning its first Pan American gold medal.

Key

Anti-doping

Media

Accreditation
A total of 1,232 media personnel were accredited with covering the games, including broadcast, press and photographers.

Broadcasting

The Canadian Broadcasting Corporation (CBC) served as the host and domestic broadcaster of the 2015 Pan American Games; locally, coverage was broadcast in the English and French languages by CBC Television and Ici Radio-Canada Télé, and CBC's website carried 650 hours of online coverage. Pay television rights were sub-licensed to Sportsnet, which aired the football (soccer) tournaments, and a semi-final of the Men's basketball tournament that involved Canada. Spanish language rights were sub-licensed to Telelatino and Univision Canada; the broadcaster collaborated with US Spanish-language rights-holder ESPN Deportes on its own coverage. CBC stated that it was "very happy" with the ratings performance of the Games; primetime coverage averaged around 900,000 to 1 million viewers per-night, and the opening ceremonies were seen by 1.93 million viewers across CBC and CBC News Network, with the largest audience being in the Toronto region.

In the United States, ESPN held broadcast rights, with 66 hours of English-language coverage across ESPN and ESPN2, 44 hours on Longhorn Network, 200 hours of Spanish-language coverage on ESPN Deportes, and streaming on WatchESPN. ESPN broadcast from studios at Corus Quay, which was linked to the IBC (and in turn, ESPN's headquarters in Bristol, Connecticut). ESPN and ESPN Deportes used their own hosts, as well of those of CBC, as part of its multi-platform coverage.

Rede Record acquired rights in Brazil, paying a record US$30 million. Other broadcasting deals include Torneos y Competencias sports in Argentina, Claro Sports in Mexico and Latina Televisión in Peru.

Marketing

Logo

Toronto's bid logo was launched on October 2, 2008, with the then-Toronto mayor David Miller and then-head of the organizing committee David Peterson unveiling the logo to the public. The bid logo looks like an abstract maple leaf with three sections, each section made up of two strokes in the shape of a "v" with a spot in the centre. The colours are green, red and blue. This was the official logo of the games until 2010, when the new logo was launched.

On September 29, 2010, the official logo of the games was unveiled at a street party at Maple Leaf Square. According to Ian Troop, the former chief executive officer of Toronto 2015 organizing committee, the logo is designed on the basis of the different art styles seen throughout the 41 countries that compete at the games.

Mascot

In January 2013, it was announced that a contest would determine the mascot of the games. Children under the age of 16 had until March 8, 2013 to submit their ideas. 4,000 ideas and drawings were submitted to the organizing committee during this time frame. In April 2013, a shortlist of six mascot designs (which were produced by professional graphic designers with the sketches by the children as models) were released, including a raccoon, beaver, moose, two pixie creature twins, porcupine and an owl. The final six were selected based on originality, how well they represent Canadian culture and the branding of the Games, and the appeal they had amongst adults and children. On April 22, 2013, the general public was allowed to vote for the mascot they felt was the best. Voting was open until May 5, 2013.

On July 17, 2013, Pachi the Porcupine was revealed as the official mascot of the games at an unveiling at the Canadian Broadcasting Centre. The mascot received over 33,000 votes from the nationwide vote. The winning design was submitted by four Grade-Eight students at a school in Markham. The name Pachi means "clapping with joy" in Japanese, while the 41 quills the porcupine has represent the 41 participating countries at the games. The New York Times described the mascot as "a departure from the usual cute and cuddly" and "a marketing challenge".

Music
The event's official theme song was released in three versions: the English-language "Together We Are One", performed by Serena Ryder; the French "Ensemble on est immense", performed by Jasmine Denham; and the Spanish "Unidos Somos Más", performed by Eva Avila.

Toronto Sign

A large, illuminated "Toronto" sculpture sign installed in Nathan Phillips Square for the Games proved to be popular with locals and tourists as a spot for photos, and came to become a symbol of the renewed enthusiasm surrounding the Pan Am Games. Considering it a symbol of their legacy, Mayor of Toronto John Tory solicited suggestions for a permanent location for the sign following the Games. It was later announced that the sign would remain in the Square in its current form through at least the end of 2016 and later extended to the end of 2017 with the temporary addition of a maple leaf for the 150th anniversary of Canadian confederation and 2018 with a medicine wheel. The sign was later replaced with a permanent version in September 2020, given the popularity of the sign, with the maple leaf and medicine wheel retained.

Sponsorship
Private sponsors included Chevrolet Canada. Another sponsorship deal with CAA South Central Ontario announced in January 2014 was terminated in May 2014.

Premier and lead partners
 Atos IT Systems
 Canadian Imperial Bank of Commerce (CIBC)
 Chevrolet (General Motors Canada)
 Cirque du Soleil
 Cisco Systems
 Live Nation Entertainment
 President's Choice (Loblaw Companies)
 Ontario Lottery and Gaming Corporation (OLG)

Official suppliers
 Aeroplan
 Aggreko
 Allstream Inc.
 ArcelorMittal
 McKesson Corporation
 Barrick Gold
 Cadillac Fairview
 Coca-Cola Canada
 DB Schenker
 Esso Canada
 Porter Airlines
 Siemens Canada

Concerns and controversies

Scheduling
The aquatics events at the 2015 Pan American Games were scheduled to be held roughly around the same time as the 2015 World Aquatics Championships scheduled in Kazan, Russia. In order to maintain the quality of its fields, the schedule of the five aquatics disciplines had to be changed to accommodate athletes. The synchronized swimming competition was moved to the day before the opening ceremony, diving events began on the day of the opening ceremony (when events are traditionally not held on the day of the ceremony), open water swimming was moved to the first weekend of the games, swimming was reduced to a five-day schedule (down from seven in 2011), and water polo competitions began three days before the opening ceremony. All events were scheduled to be completed by July 24, six days before the opening ceremonies of the World Championships, which in itself was moved back a week to accommodate the games. The change in schedule meant that for the first time, events were held before the opening ceremony.

The 2015 FIFA Women's World Cup, which was held in various Canadian cities, concluded on the Sunday prior to the opening ceremony; due to the proximity of the events, teams who competed in both the Women's World Cup and the Pan Am women's football tournament were not expected to field their best players due to availability. Toronto decided not to bid to host matches during the Women's World Cup due to a potential conflict with the Games.

The 2015 World Archery Championships were scheduled later in July, to avoid conflict with the games, while the 2015 World Fencing Championships (which finished one day prior to the start of fencing competitions at the Pan-Am Games) were coordinated to allow athletes to compete at both events. Finally, the second round of the 2015 Davis Cup was moved ahead one week to avoid conflict with the tennis competitions. Tennis competitions were held before the opening ceremony, to allow athletes to compete in both events.

The volleyball tournaments and the FIVB Volleyball World Grand Prix and the FIVB Volleyball World League were played at roughly the same time, leading to scheduling conflicts for teams playing both events.

The IndyCar Series' Honda Indy Toronto race (later renamed Grand Prix of Toronto), which is held on a street circuit at Exhibition Place, was moved to June from July to avoid conflicting with the Games.

Expenses claims
In September 2013, it was reported that many senior members of the organizing committee, including then-CEO Ian Troop, expensed Ontario taxpayers for things such as a cup of tea. This led to outrage among provincial politicians including Ontario Premier Kathleen Wynne, "I'm just going to say it's ridiculous. It is the kind of entitlement that is unacceptable". In response to the backlash the organization released an updated expenses and travel policy in November 2013. In December 2013, Troop was ousted by the organization's board of directors, just three months after the expense scandal came into light. He was replaced by Saad Rafi. In 2014, more expenses by the organization came under scrutiny including boxes of South American wine.

In 2015, Ian Troop, the former CEO, gave an interview in which he stated that organizers cleared him from any wrongdoing, and that all expenses fell under the organization's policy. Troop also mentioned under his leadership the organization saved  million from the capital infrastructure budget. Troop's firing had nothing to do with the expenses scandal that arose in 2013.

Executive compensation and bonuses
The games' organizing committee came under scrutiny for the high compensation and bonus packages its executive team has been awarded. Additionally, in 2013 it was revealed that as part of his compensation package, Troop would be eligible for a  bonus at the end of his contract, if the games had finished successfully. Other executives are eligible for bonuses of up to 100 percent of their salaries upon completion of their contract. In 2015, it was revealed that Troop's replacement, Saad Rafi, would receive a bonus of 100 percent of his  salary upon completion of his contract. Rafi did not collect his bonus at the conclusion of the games.

Canadian television coverage
Although still billed as having been the most extensive television coverage of the Pan American Games ever broadcast in the country, the CBC faced criticism for the amount of coverage it produced and broadcast from the 2015 Pan American Games. Only condensed, tape-delayed highlights of events aired on CBC Television, drawing comparisons to the similar practices imposed by NBC's coverage of the Olympics. Most events were streamed online, and pay television channel Sportsnet aired the soccer tournaments on television, but events in some sports received only limited online coverage or were not broadcast at all. Partway through the Games, the CBC expanded its primetime coverage block, while broadcasts of a semi-final game in men's basketball on Sportsnet and the baseball finals online were added at the last minute. Critics perceived these last-minute changes as signs that the CBC had underestimated viewer interest in the Pan Am Games.

CBC Sports head of programming Trevor Pilling explained that the large number of events being held, along with the stature of the Pan American Games in comparison to the Olympics, were a factor in the structure of CBC's coverage, stating that "I do think we are the victim of our own success in that having Olympic coverage that is around the clock, but the Olympics are a different event than these Pan Am Games. But I feel like we've done the athletes justice by telling those stories or through live coverage, or with reporters on site. We've tried to make sure we're at all the significant events, and with Canada winning over 180 medals, that's a tall task."

While the National Post also felt that budget cuts faced by the CBC in recent years, including those imposed following the loss of its national broadcast rights to the National Hockey League to Rogers Media, may have also had an impact—with a CBC spokesperson arguing that "resources" were a factor, Pilling denied that this was the case, arguing that it was "about the planning, It is about making good, sound business decisions", and promised that there would be extensive coverage of the 2016 Summer Olympics.

References

External links

 
 Toronto 2015 - XVII Pan American Games - Official Report at PanamSports.org
 Toronto 2015 Pan Am & Parapan American Games – Web archive collected by the University of Toronto Libraries

2015 Pan American Games
Multi-sport events in Canada
Pan American Games
Pan American Games
Pan American Games
Pan American Games
Pan American Games
Pan American Games
International sports competitions in Toronto
Sport in Ontario